Danielle Fichaud (born April 13, 1954) is a Canadian actress from Quebec. She is most noted for her performance in the 2021 film Aline, for which she was a César Award nominee for Best Supporting Actress at the 47th César Awards and a Prix Iris nominee for Best Actress at the 24th Quebec Cinema Awards.

Filmography

Television 
 Chez Denise
 Willie
 Fred-dy 
 Tag
 Fortier
 Jasmine
 Musée Éden
 Miss Météo
 Vrak la Vie
 Bunker, le cirque
 Virginie
 District 31

Film 
 1995 - The Confessional (Le Confessionnal)
 1996 - Poverty and Other Delights (Joyeux calvaire)
 2000 - Heaven (Le Petit ciel)
 2006 - Deliver Me (Délivrez-moi)
 2007 - Days of Darkness (L'Âge des ténèbres)
 2009 - Vital Signs (Les Signes vitaux)
 2009 - The Legacy (La Donation)
 2010 - Piché: The Landing of a Man (Piché, entre ciel et terre)
 2015 - The Passion of Augustine (La Passion d'Augustine)
 2019 - Mon ami Walid
 2021 - Aline

References

External links

1954 births
Living people
20th-century Canadian actresses
21st-century Canadian actresses
Canadian film actresses
Canadian television actresses
Actresses from Quebec
French Quebecers